IOI may refer to:
 Idiopathic orbital inflammatory disease
 International Olympiad in Informatics
 Interonset interval
 Indication of interest, used in financial trading
 Interest on Investment, a synonym for Return on Investment (ROI)
 IO Interactive, a Danish video game developer
 International Ombudsman Institute
 IOI Group, a Malaysian conglomerate
 I.O.I, a South Korean girl group formed from the television show Produce 101
 Innovative Online Industries (IOI), the fictional corporation that employs most of the antagonists of the 2011 novel Ready Player One and its 2018 film adaptation

See also
 LOL (disambiguation)
 101 (disambiguation)